The Intellectual Property Office of New Zealand (IPONZ) is a New Zealand government agency responsible for the granting and registration of intellectual property rights, specifically patent, trade mark, design and plant variety rights. It is part of the New Zealand Ministry of Business, Innovation and Employment. According to its website, IPONZ "aims to ensure people realise the full economic potential of their intellectual property."

Activities 
IPONZ has a long history, beginning with the establishment of the New Zealand Patent Office in 1870. It now administers the Patents Act 1953, Patents Act 2013, the Trade Marks Act 2002, the Designs Act 1953 and the Plant Variety Rights Act 1987.

Over the period from 1 July 2011 to 30 June 2012, IPONZ received 17,675 trade mark applications, 6,253 patent applications including Patent Cooperation Treaty National Entry filings, and 1,283 design applications.

Online services 
IPONZ services are provided via its online case management facility. Its services include:

 IPONZ Database - search for patents, trade marks, designs, plant variety rights and Hearing decisions for free.
 IPONZ Renewals - applicant can renew their patent, trade mark or design online.
 Lodge Application - apply online for a search and preliminary advice for trade marks and apply to register a trade mark, patent or design online.
 Online Correspondence - submit and view your patent, trade mark and design correspondence online. Select from a range of document types including:
 a response to your examination report or objections raised in your compliance report,
 assignments, change of name or address requests,
 requests for a certificate of Commissioner,
 extension of time requests
 Online Journal - search the intellectual property journals.

IPONZ email updates 
IPONZ produces a short and concise eNewsletter containing important intellectual property information and updates. Subscribers can elect to receive eNewsletters containing specific information of interest to them including:
Journal Publications (Patents, Trade Marks and Designs)
Plant Variety Rights Journal Publication
Decisions of the Commissioner
Practice Notes and Legislation
Online System Changes

See also 
 Copyright law of New Zealand

References

External links 
 Intellectual Property Office of New Zealand
 Ministry of Business, Innovation and Employment
 World Intellectual Property Organisation
 New Zealand Legislation
 Copyright Council of New Zealand

New Zealand Public Service departments
New Zealand